Jacoona anasuja is a butterfly in the family Lycaenidae. It was described by Cajetan Felder and Rudolf Felder in 1865. It is found in the Indomalayan realm.

The larvae feed on Scurrula ferruginea.

Subspecies
Jacoona anasuja anasuja (Borneo, Sumatra, Peninsular Malaysia, Singapore)
Jacoona anasuja jusana Druce, 1895 (northern Borneo)
Jacoona anasuja nigerrima Corbet, 1948 (southern Burma, Thailand, Laos)

References

External links

 Jacoona at Markku Savela's Lepidoptera and Some Other Life Forms

Jacoona
Butterflies described in 1865
Butterflies of Asia
Taxa named by Baron Cajetan von Felder
Taxa named by Rudolf Felder